Transylvania is an unincorporated community in East Carroll Parish, Louisiana, United States. As of the 2000 census, the population of Transylvania was 743.

Geography
Transylvania is located at 32.66° north, 91.25° west (ZIP Code centroid).

The U.S. Census Bureau lacks statistics for the total area, land and water areas of Transylvania.

History

Transylvania was named in the early 19th century by Transylvania University alumnus Dr. W. L. Richards.  He bought large acreage in the northern Louisiana area and named the town after his beloved school, still in existence today in Lexington, Kentucky.

As the name of Transylvania is associated by many people in the United States with the Hollywood Dracula movies, the general store in the town sells Dracula- and bat-related merchandise to people passing through on Highway 65.

References 

Unincorporated communities in Louisiana
Unincorporated communities in East Carroll Parish, Louisiana